Hobølelva is a river rising in Sværsvann in Oslo, until joining Lake Vansjø in Østfold.

Rivers of Oslo
Rivers of Norway